Diplectrona is a genus of netspinning caddisflies in the family Hydropsychidae. There are more than 100 described species in Diplectrona.

See also
 List of Diplectrona species

References

Further reading

 
 
 

Trichoptera genera
Articles created by Qbugbot